Ginny Purdy-Paskoff (born November 15, 1966) is a former professional tennis player from the United States.

Biography
Purdy, who grew up in Indianapolis and attended North Central High School, began competing on the tour in 1983.

Aged 16, Purdy made two WTA Tour finals in her first season, while still a junior at high school. She was runner-up at her home tournament, the 1983 Virginia Slims Indianapolis Indoor, then won the 1983 Pittsburgh Open, as a lucky loser.

In 1984 she competed in the main draw of the French Open, Wimbledon and US Open.

From 1985 to 1989 she was at the University of Southern California and played collegiate tennis.

She continues to live in Indianapolis and is now a real estate agent.

WTA Tour finals

Singles (1-1)

References

External links
 
 

1966 births
Living people
American female tennis players
Tennis players from Indianapolis
USC Trojans women's tennis players